Thunder River Feud is a 1942 American Western film directed by S. Roy Luby and written by John Vlahos and Earle Snell. The film is the twelfth in Monogram Pictures' "Range Busters" series, and it stars Ray "Crash" Corrigan as Crash, John "Dusty" King as Dusty and Max "Alibi" Terhune as Alibi, with Jan Wiley, Jack Holmes and Rick Anderson. The film was released on January 9, 1942.

Plot
At the Tucson Rodeo, Dusty fails in a competition, but the winner is Crash who earns a prize belt. When Crash is having a bath a newspaper photographer comes into the room and takes a picture of Dusty identifying himself as Crash. Crash is angry that Dusty has stolen his name and glory but sees that the beautiful Maybelle Pembroke is returning home to Thunder River. Alibi had worked for the Pembrokes long ago but warns Crash that she would not be interested in a cowboy. Crash pawns his prize belt to buy a suit where he masquerades as a writer from New England. Dusty arrives at the ranch to impersonate Crash as the new foreman. The trio unite to stop a feud between two families in Thunder River with a Romeo and Juliet type situation where Maybelle loves Grover Harrison from the family that is the sworn enemy of the Pembrokes.

Cast
Ray "Crash" Corrigan as 'Crash' Corrigan 
John 'Dusty' King as 'Dusty' King
Max Terhune as 'Alibi' Terhune 
Jan Wiley as Maybelle Pembroke
Jack Holmes as Jim Pembroke 
Rick Anderson as Colonel Harrison
Carleton Young as Grover Harrison
George Chesebro as Dick Taggert
Carl Mathews as Pete
Budd Buster as Sheriff
Ted Mapes as Buck
Steve Clark as Shorty Branson

See also
The Range Busters series:

 The Range Busters (1940)
 Trailing Double Trouble (1940)
 West of Pinto Basin (1940)
 Trail of the Silver Spurs (1941)
 The Kid's Last Ride (1941)
 Tumbledown Ranch in Arizona (1941)
 Wrangler's Roost (1941)
 Fugitive Valley (1941)
 Saddle Mountain Roundup (1941)
 Tonto Basin Outlaws (1941)
 Underground Rustlers (1941)
 Thunder River Feud (1942)
 Rock River Renegades (1942)
 Boot Hill Bandits (1942)
 Texas Trouble Shooters (1942)
 Arizona Stage Coach (1942)
 Texas to Bataan (1942)
 Trail Riders (1942)
 Two Fisted Justice (1943)
 Haunted Ranch (1943)
 Land of Hunted Men (1943)
 Cowboy Commandos (1943)
 Black Market Rustlers (1943)
 Bullets and Saddles (1943)

References

External links
 

1942 films
1940s English-language films
American Western (genre) films
1942 Western (genre) films
Monogram Pictures films
Films directed by S. Roy Luby
American black-and-white films
Range Busters
1940s American films